Clube Atlético Catarinense, commonly known as Atlético Catarinense, is a Brazilian football club based in São José, Santa Catarina.

History

The club was founded in 2020 to represent the city of São José in professional football, which had not had a club since 2002. Initially playing in the Campeonato Catarinense Série C, the third tier of football in Santa Catarina, the club won the championship and a promotion to Série B. The club was the 2022 runner-up in Série B, losing to Criciúma in the championship.

Honours

 Campeonato Catarinense Série C:
 Winners (1): 2020

 Campeonato Catarinense Série B:
 Runners-up (1): 2022

Notable players

 Sidão

References

External links
 

Association football clubs established in 2020
2020 establishments in Brazil
Atlético Catarinense